Crestwood Village is an unincorporated community and census-designated place (CDP) located within Manchester Township, in Ocean County, New Jersey, United States. As of the 2010 United States Census, the CDP's population was 7,907.

Geography
According to the United States Census Bureau, the CDP had a total area of 4.358 square miles (11.288 km2), including 4.297 square miles (11.130 km2) of land and 0.061 square miles (0.158 km2) of water (1.40%).

Demographics

Census 2010

Census 2000
As of the 2000 United States Census there were 8,392 people, 5,694 households, and 2,277 families living in the CDP. The population density was 738.1/km2 (1,910.1/mi2). There were 6,448 housing units at an average density of 567.1/km2 (1,467.7/mi2). The racial makeup of the CDP was 98.38% White, 0.76% African American, 0.07% Native American, 0.24% Asian, 0.14% from other races, and 0.41% from two or more races. Hispanic or Latino of any race were 1.12% of the population.

There were 5,694 households, out of which 0.2% had children under the age of 18 living with them, 35.5% were married couples living together, 3.5% had a female householder with no husband present, and 60.0% were non-families. 58.1% of all households were made up of individuals, and 53.0% had someone living alone who was 65 years of age or older. The average household size was 1.45 and the average family size was 2.08.

In the CDP the population was spread out, with 0.4% under the age of 18, 0.3% from 18 to 24, 2.1% from 25 to 44, 13.3% from 45 to 64, and 84.0% who were 65 years of age or older. The median age was 76 years. For every 100 females, there were 57.3 males. For every 100 females age 18 and over, there were 57.2 males.

The median income for a household in the CDP was $22,615, and the median income for a family was $30,617. Males had a median income of $33,875 versus $26,359 for females. The per capita income for the CDP was $23,841. About 2.2% of families and 7.1% of the population were below the poverty line, including none of those under age 18 and 5.8% of those age 65 or over.

References

Census-designated places in Ocean County, New Jersey
Manchester Township, New Jersey
Populated places in the Pine Barrens (New Jersey)